Princess Isabella Orsini de Ligne de La Trémoïlle (born 2 December 1974) is an Italian actress. By marriage, she is a member of the House of Ligne, a Belgian noble family.

Biography
Daughter of a gallery owner and a court clerk, after graduating from classical high school she graduated in law in her city.

She studied both in Italy and in the United States at the Actors Studio and following theatrical specialization courses with Bernard Hill, in Los Angeles.

Family
Orsini married in a civil ceremony on 2 September 2009 and in a religious ceremony on 5 September 2009, to Prince Édouard Lamoral Rodolphe de Ligne de La Trémoïlle (born 1976), at Antoing Castle in the Hainaut province of Belgium.

The couple's first child, Princess Althea Isabelle Sophie de Ligne de la Trémoïlle, was born on 12 May 2010 at the private "Villa Mafalda" clinic in Rome. On 9 May 2014, the couple had their second child, Princess Athénaïs Allegra Isabella de Ligne de la Trémoïlle at the American Hospital of Paris. On 10 January 2019, Orsini gave birth to the couple's third child, Prince Antoine Tau Édouard Adrien de Ligne de la Trémoïlle in Paris, France.

As Belgium is a monarchy which confers and recognises hereditary titles of nobility, the right of Orsini and her Ligne la Trémoïlle children to the prefix of prince and princess and to the style of Highness is legal—not a courtesy title; all members of the House of Ligne have been entitled to princely rank and to the style of Altesse in Belgium since 31 May 1923.

Filmography

Cinema

Television

Shorts

References

External links

 Personal website
 Isabella Orsini @ ECI Global Talent
 

Italian stage actresses
Italian television actresses
People from Perugia
Italian nobility
Belgian princesses
Princesses by marriage
Orsini family
House of Ligne
1974 births
Living people